is the capital of Hiroshima Prefecture in Japan. , the city had an estimated population of 1,199,391. The gross domestic product (GDP) in Greater Hiroshima, Hiroshima Urban Employment Area, was US$61.3 billion as of 2010. Kazumi Matsui has been the city's mayor since April 2011.

Hiroshima was founded in 1589 as a castle town on the Ōta River delta. Following the Meiji Restoration in 1868, Hiroshima rapidly transformed into a major urban center and industrial hub. In 1889, Hiroshima officially gained city status. The city was a center of military activities during the imperial era, playing significant roles such as in the First Sino-Japanese War, the Russo-Japanese War, and the two world wars.

Hiroshima was the first military target of a nuclear weapon in human history. This occurred on August 6, 1945 in the Pacific theatre of World War II, at 8:15 a.m., when the United States Army Air Forces (USAAF) dropped the atomic bomb "Little Boy" on the city. Most of Hiroshima was destroyed, and by the end of the year between 90,000 and 166,000 had died as a result of the blast and its effects. The Hiroshima Peace Memorial (a UNESCO World Heritage Site) serves as a memorial of the bombing.

Since being rebuilt after the war, Hiroshima has become the largest city in the Chūgoku region of western Honshu.

History

Early history 
The region where Hiroshima stands today was originally a small fishing village along the shores of Hiroshima Bay. From the 12th century, the village was rather prosperous and was economically attached to a Zen Buddhist temple called Mitaki-Ji. This new prosperity was partly caused by the increase of trade with the rest of Japan under the auspices of the Taira clan.

Sengoku and Edo periods (1589–1871)

Hiroshima was established on the delta coastline of the Seto Inland Sea in 1589 by powerful warlord Mōri Terumoto. Hiroshima Castle was quickly built, and in 1593 Mōri moved in. The name Hiroshima means wide island in Japanese. Terumoto was on the losing side at the Battle of Sekigahara. The winner of the battle, Tokugawa Ieyasu, deprived Mōri Terumoto of most of his fiefs, including Hiroshima and gave Aki Province to Masanori Fukushima, a daimyō (Feudal Lord) who had supported Tokugawa. From 1619 until 1871, Hiroshima was ruled by the Asano clan.

Meiji and Showa periods (1871–1939)
After the Han was abolished in 1871, the city became the capital of Hiroshima Prefecture.  Hiroshima became a major urban center during the imperial period, as the Japanese economy shifted from primarily rural to urban industries. During the 1870s, one of the seven government-sponsored English language schools was established in Hiroshima. Ujina Harbor was constructed through the efforts of Hiroshima Governor Sadaaki Senda in the 1880s, allowing Hiroshima to become an important port city.

The San'yō Railway was extended to Hiroshima in 1894, and a rail line from the main station to the harbor was constructed for military transportation during the First Sino-Japanese War. During that war, the Japanese government moved temporarily to Hiroshima, and Emperor Meiji maintained his headquarters at Hiroshima Castle from September 15, 1894, to April 27, 1895. The significance of Hiroshima for the Japanese government can be discerned from the fact that the first round of talks between Chinese and Japanese representatives to end the Sino-Japanese War was held in Hiroshima, from February 1 to 4, 1895. New industrial plants, including cotton mills, were established in Hiroshima in the late 19th century. Further industrialization in Hiroshima was stimulated during the Russo-Japanese War in 1904, which required development and production of military supplies. The Hiroshima Prefectural Commercial Exhibition Hall was constructed in 1915 as a center for trade and the exhibition of new products. Later, its name was changed to Hiroshima Prefectural Product Exhibition Hall, and again to Hiroshima Prefectural Industrial Promotion Hall.

During World War I, Hiroshima became a focal point of military activity, as the Japanese government entered the war on the Allied forces. About 500 German P.O.W.'s were held in Ninoshima Island in Hiroshima Bay. The growth of Hiroshima as a city continued after the First World War, as the city now attracted the attention of the Catholic Church, and on May 4, 1923, an Apostolic Vicar was appointed for that city.

World War II and the atomic bombing (1939–1945)

During World War II, the Second General Army and Chūgoku Regional Army was headquartered in Hiroshima, and the Army Marine Headquarters was located at Ujina port. The city also had large depots of military supplies, and was a key center for shipping.

The bombing of Tokyo and other cities in Japan during World War II caused widespread destruction and hundreds of thousands of civilian deaths. There were no such air raids on Hiroshima. However, a real threat existed and was recognized. To protect against potential firebombings in Hiroshima, school children aged 11–14 years were mobilized to demolish houses and create firebreaks.

On Monday, August 6, 1945, at 8:15 a.m. (Hiroshima time), the nuclear weapon "Little Boy" was dropped on Hiroshima from an American Boeing B-29 Superfortress, the Enola Gay, flown by Paul Warfield Tibbets Jr. (23 February 1915 – 1 November 2007), directly killing at least 70,000 people, including thousands of Korean slave laborers. Fewer than 10% of the casualties were military. By the end of the year, injury and radiation brought the total number of deaths to 90,000–140,000. The population before the bombing was around 345,000. About 70% of the city's buildings were destroyed, and another 7% severely damaged.

The public release of film footage of the city following the attack, and some of the Atomic Bomb Casualty Commission research on the human effects of the attack, were restricted during the occupation of Japan, and much of this information was censored until the signing of the Treaty of San Francisco in 1951, restoring control to the Japanese.

As Ian Buruma observed:  The US occupation authorities maintained a monopoly on scientific and medical information about the effects of the atomic bomb through the work of the Atomic Bomb Casualty Commission, which treated the data gathered in studies of hibakusha as privileged information rather than making the results available for the treatment of victims or providing financial or medical support to aid victims.

The book Hiroshima by John Hersey was originally published in article form in the magazine The New Yorker, on August 31, 1946. It is reported to have reached Tokyo, in English, at least by January 1947 and the translated version was released in Japan in 1949. Although the article was planned to be published over four issues, "Hiroshima" made up the entire contents of one issue of the magazine. Hiroshima narrates the stories of six bomb survivors immediately before and four months after the dropping of the Little Boy bomb.

Oleander (Nerium) is the official flower of the city of Hiroshima because it was the first to bloom again after the explosion of the atomic bomb in 1945.

Postwar period (1945–present)
On September 17, 1945, Hiroshima was struck by the Makurazaki Typhoon (Typhoon Ida). Hiroshima Prefecture suffered more than 3,000 deaths and injuries, about half the national total.  More than half the bridges in the city were destroyed, along with heavy damage to roads and railroads, further devastating the city.

Hiroshima was rebuilt after the war, with help from the national government through the Hiroshima Peace Memorial City Construction Law passed in 1949. It provided financial assistance for reconstruction, along with land donated that was previously owned by the national government and used by the Imperial military.

In 1949, a design was selected for the Hiroshima Peace Memorial Park. Hiroshima Prefectural Industrial Promotion Hall, the closest surviving building to the location of the bomb's detonation, was designated the Genbaku Dome (原爆ドーム) or "Atomic Dome", a part of the Hiroshima Peace Memorial Park. The Hiroshima Peace Memorial Museum was opened in 1955 in the Peace Park. The historic castle of Hiroshima was rebuilt in 1958.

Hiroshima also contains a Peace Pagoda, built in 1966 by Nipponzan-Myōhōji. Uniquely, the pagoda is made of steel, rather than the usual stone.

Hiroshima was proclaimed a City of Peace by the Japanese parliament in 1949, at the initiative of its mayor, Shinzo Hamai (1905–1968). As a result, the city of Hiroshima received more international attention as a desirable location for holding international conferences on peace as well as social issues. As part of that effort, the Hiroshima Interpreters' and Guide's Association (HIGA) was established in 1992 to facilitate interpretation for conferences, and the Hiroshima Peace Institute was established in 1998 within the Hiroshima University. The city government continues to advocate the abolition of all nuclear weapons and the Mayor of Hiroshima is the president of Mayors for Peace, an international Mayoral organization mobilizing cities and citizens worldwide to abolish and eliminate nuclear weapons by 2020.

On May 27, 2016, Barack Obama became the first sitting United States president to visit Hiroshima since the atomic bombing.

Hiroshima is situated on the Ōta River delta, on Hiroshima Bay, facing the Seto Inland Sea on its south side. The river's six channels divide Hiroshima into several islets.

Geography

Climate 
Hiroshima has a humid subtropical climate characterized by cool to mild winters and hot, humid summers. Like much of Japan, Hiroshima experiences a seasonal temperature lag in summer, with August rather than July being the warmest month of the year. Precipitation occurs year-round, although winter is the driest season. Rainfall peaks in June and July, with August experiencing sunnier and drier conditions.

Wards
Hiroshima has eight wards (ku):

Cityscape

Demographics

In 2017, the city has an estimated population of 1,195,327. As of 2023, the city has a population of 1,183,696.

The population around 1910 was 143,000. Before World War II, Hiroshima's population had grown to 360,000, and peaked at 419,182 in 1942. Following the atomic bombing in 1945, the population dropped to 137,197. By 1955, the city's population had returned to pre-war levels.

Surrounding municipalities 
Hiroshima Prefecture
Kure
Higashihiroshima
Akitakata
Hatsukaichi
Akiota
Kitahiroshima
Fuchū
Saka
Kumano
Kaita

Economy and infrastructure 
Mazda Motor Corporation
Mitsubishi, Kawasaki, JMUcor IHI Kure Works, Mitsui and other shipyards on the area
Mitsubishi HI Kanon and Eba Works, IHI Kure machinery

Health care

Hospitals
Hiroshima City Hospital
Hiroshima City Asa Hospital
Hiroshima City Funairi Hospital
Hiroshima Prefectural Hospital
Hiroshima Red Cross Hospital & Atomic-bomb Survivors Hospital
Hiroshima University Hospital
Japan Post Hiroshima Hospital
JR Hiroshima Hospital

Media
The Chūgoku Shimbun is the local newspaper serving Hiroshima. It publishes both morning paper and evening editions. Television stations include Hiroshima Home Television, Hiroshima Telecasting, Shinhiroshima Telecasting, and the RCC Broadcasting. Radio stations include Hiroshima FM, Chugoku Communication Network, FM Fukuyama, FM Nanami, and Onomichi FM. Hiroshima is also served by NHK, Japan's public broadcaster, with television and radio broadcasting.

The Maxwell Rayner TV Co. filmed a documentary released in 2012. The documentary contained general information about the city.

Education

University
Hiroshima University was established in 1949, as part of a national restructuring of the education system. One national university was set up in each prefecture, including Hiroshima University, which combined eight existing institutions (Hiroshima University of Literature and Science, Hiroshima School of Secondary Education, Hiroshima School of Education, Hiroshima Women's School of Secondary Education, Hiroshima School of Education for Youth, Hiroshima Higher School, Hiroshima Higher Technical School, and Hiroshima Municipal Higher Technical School), with the Hiroshima Prefectural Medical College added in 1953. But in 1972 the relocation of Hiroshima University was decided from urban areas of Hiroshima City to wider campus in Higashihiroshima City. By 1995 almost all campuses were relocated to Higashihiroshima. But, School of Medicine, School of Dentistry, School of Pharmaceutical Sciences and Graduate School in these fields in Kasumi Campus and Law School and Center for Research on Regional Economic System in Higashi-Senda Campus are still in Hiroshima City.

Notable art institutions include the Elisabeth University of Music and Actor's School Hiroshima.

Notable people
Reiji Okazaki (岡崎 令治, 1930–1975), molecular biologist, discoverer of Okazaki fragments

Transportation

Airways

Airport

Railways

High-speed rail
JR West
San'yō Shinkansen

Trains
JR West
San'yō Main Line, Kure Line, Geibi Line, Kabe Line
Hiroshima New Transit Line 1
Hiroshima Short Distance Transit Seno Line

Tramways
Hiroshima is notable, in Japan, for its light rail system, nicknamed Hiroden, and the "Moving Streetcar Museum". Streetcar service started in 1912, was interrupted by the atomic bomb, and was restored as soon as was practical. (Service between Koi/Nishi Hiroshima and Tenma-cho was started up three days after the bombing.)

Streetcars and light rail vehicles are still rolling down Hiroshima's streets, including streetcars 651 and 652, which survived the atomic blast and are among the older streetcars in the system. When Kyoto and Fukuoka discontinued their trolley systems, Hiroshima bought them up at discounted prices, and, by 2011, the city had 298 streetcars, more than any other city in Japan.
Hiroden
Main Line, Ujina Line, Eba Line, Hakushima Line, Hijiyama Line, Yokogawa Line, Miyajima Line

Roads

Expressway
Hiroshima Expressway

Japan National Route
Hiroshima is served by Japan National Route 2, Japan National Route 54, Japan National Route 183, Japan National Route 261, Japan National Route 433, Japan National Route 487, Japan National Route 488.

Prefectural Route
Hiroshima Prefectural Route 37 (Hiroshima-Miyoshi Route), Hiroshima Prefectural Route 70 (Hiroshima-Nakashima Route), Hiroshima Prefectural Route 84 (Higashi Kaita Hiroshima Route), Hiroshima Prefectural Route 164 (Hiroshima-Kaita Route), and Hiroshima Prefectural Route 264 (Nakayama-Onaga Route).

Culture

Hiroshima has a professional symphony orchestra, which has performed at Wel City Hiroshima since 1963.  There are also many museums in Hiroshima, including the Hiroshima Peace Memorial Museum, along with several art museums.  The Hiroshima Museum of Art, which has a large collection of French renaissance art, opened in 1978.  The Hiroshima Prefectural Art Museum opened in 1968 and is located near Shukkei-en gardens.  The Hiroshima City Museum of Contemporary Art, which opened in 1989, is located near Hijiyama Park.  Festivals include Hiroshima Flower Festival and Hiroshima International Animation Festival.

Hiroshima Peace Memorial Park, which includes the Hiroshima Peace Memorial, draws many visitors from around the world, especially for the Hiroshima Peace Memorial Ceremony, an annual commemoration held on the date of the atomic bombing. The park also contains a large collection of monuments, including the Children's Peace Monument, the Hiroshima National Peace Memorial Hall for the Atomic Bomb Victims and many others.

Hiroshima's rebuilt castle (nicknamed Rijō, meaning Koi Castle) houses a museum of life in the Edo period. Hiroshima Gokoku Shrine is within the walls of the castle. Other attractions in Hiroshima include Shukkei-en, Fudōin, Mitaki-dera, and Hijiyama Park.

Events

Hiroshima Flower Festival, May 3–5, Heiwa Odori, Hiroshima Peace Memorial Park
Toukasan, first Friday to Sunday in June, Mikawa-Cho, Chuo Dori
Ebisu Festival, November 18–20, Ebisucho, Hacchobori, Chuo Dori
Hiroshima Peace Memorial Ceremony, August 6, Hiroshima Peace Memorial Park
1994 Asian Games

Cuisine

Hiroshima is known for okonomiyaki, a savory (umami) pancake cooked on an iron plate, usually in front of the customer. It is cooked with various ingredients, which are layered rather than mixed as done with the Osaka version of okonomiyaki. The layers are typically egg, cabbage, bean sprouts (moyashi), sliced pork/bacon with optional items (mayonnaise, fried squid, octopus, cheese, mochi, kimchi, etc.), and noodles (soba, udon) topped with another layer of egg and a generous dollop of okonomiyaki sauce (Carp and Otafuku are two popular brands). The amount of cabbage used is usually 3 to 4 times the amount used in the Osaka style. It starts piled very high and is generally pushed down as the cabbage cooks. The order of the layers may vary slightly depending on the chef's style and preference, and ingredients will vary depending on the preference of the customer.

Sports

Hiroshima has several professional sports clubs.

Football
The city's main association football club is Sanfrecce Hiroshima, who play at the Hiroshima Big Arch. As Toyo Kogyo Soccer Club, they won the Japan Soccer League five times between 1965 and 1970 and the Emperor's Cup in 1965, 1967 and 1969. After adopting their current name in 1992, the club won the J.League in 2012, 2013 and 2015. The city's main women's football club is Angeviolet Hiroshima. Defunct clubs include Rijo Shukyu FC, who won the Emperor's Cup in 1924 and 1925, and Ẽfini Hiroshima SC.

Baseball
Hiroshima Toyo Carp are the city's major baseball club, and play at the Mazda Zoom-Zoom Stadium Hiroshima.
Members of the Central League, the club won the Central League in 1975, 1979, 1980, 1984, 1986, 1991, 2016, 2017 and 2018, the club won the Japan Series in 1979, 1980 and 1984.

Basketball
Hiroshima Dragonflies (basketball).

Handball
Hiroshima Maple Reds (handball).

Volleyball
JT Thunders (volleyball).

Other sports
The Woodone Open Hiroshima was part of the Japan Golf Tour between 1973 and 2007. The city also hosted the 1994 Asian Games, using the Big Arch stadium, which is now used for the annual Mikio Oda Memorial International Amateur Athletic Game. The now-called Hiroshima Prefectural Sports Center was one of the host arenas of the 2006 FIBA World Championship (basketball).

International relations

Twin towns – sister cities

Hiroshima has ten sister cities:

 Bologna, Emilia-Romagna, Italy (since May 1962)
 Chongqing, China (since October 1986)
 Columbus, OH, United States (since July 1990)
 Guernica, Basque Country, Spain (since Feb 1961)
 Daegu, South Korea (since May 1997)
 Hanover, Lower Saxony, Germany (since June 1983)
 Honolulu, HI, United States (since June 1959)
 Montreal, QC, Canada (since June 1998)
 Nantes, Pays de la Loire, France (since March 1986)
 Volgograd, Russia (since September 1972)

Within Japan, Hiroshima has a similar relationship with Nagasaki.

Tourism
The Japanese city and the Prefecture of Hiroshima may have been devastated by the atomic bomb over 77 years ago, but today, this site of the destruction is one of the top tourist destinations in the entire country.  Statistics released by the nation's tourist agency revealed that around 363,000 visitors went to the metropolis during 2012, with Americans making up the vast majority of that figure, followed by Australians and Chinese.
In 2016, some 1.18 million foreigners visited Hiroshima, a 3.2-fold jump from about 360,000 in 2012. Americans were the largest group, accounting for 16%, followed by Australians at 15%, Italians at 8% and Britons at 6%. The numbers of Chinese and South Korean visitors were small, representing only 1% and 0.2% of the total.

Places of interest
There are many popular tourist destinations near Hiroshima. A popular destination outside the city is Itsukushima Island, also known as Miyajima, which is a sacred island with many temples and shrines. But inside Hiroshima there are many popular destinations as well, and according to online guidebooks, these are the most popular tourist destinations in Hiroshima:
Hiroshima Peace Memorial Museum
The Atomic Bomb Dome
Hiroshima Peace Memorial Park
Mazda Zoom-Zoom Stadium Hiroshima
Hiroshima Castle
Shukkei-en
Mitaki-dera Temple
Hiroshima Gogoku Shrine
Kamiyacho and Hatchobori (A major center in Hiroshima which is a shopping area. It is directly connected to the Hiroshima Bus Center)
Hiroshima City Asa Zoological Park
Hiroshima Botanical Garden

Other popular places in the city include the Hondōri shopping arcade.

Notes

References

Further reading
Pacific War Research Society, Japan's Longest Day (Kodansha, 2002), the internal Japanese account of the surrender and how it was almost thwarted by fanatic soldiers who attempted a coup against the Emperor.
Richard B. Frank, Downfall: The End of the Imperial Japanese Empire Penguin, 2001  )
Robert Jungk, Children of the Ashes, 1st Eng. ed. 1961. Gyanpedia.in PDF
Gar Alperovitz, The Decision to Use the Atomic Bomb, 
John Hersey, Hiroshima, 
Michihiko Hachiya, Hiroshima Diary: The Journal of a Japanese Physician, August 6 – September 30, 1945 (Chapel Hill: University of North Carolina Press, 1955), since reprinted.
Masuji Ibuse, Black Rain, 
Tamiki Hara, Summer Flowers 
Robert Jay Lifton Death in life: The survivors of Hiroshima, Weidenfeld & Nicolson 1st edition (1968)

External links

 
Hiroshima City official website  (In English)
Official tourist information website (in 5 languages)
Hiroshima before and after atomic bombing – interactive aerial maps
Hiroshima atomic bomb damage – interactive aerial map
Is Hiroshima still radioactive? – No. Includes explanation.

City Mayors article
CBC Digital Archives – Shadows of Hiroshima
Hiroshima Map – interactive with points of interest
BBC World Service BBC Witness programme interviews a schoolgirl who survived the bomb
Hope Elizabeth May, "Creating Peace through Law: the City of Hiroshima" 
hiroshima-navi
"Hiroshima" By John Hersey, A Reporter at Large August 31, 1946 Issue of The New Yorker

 
Cities in Hiroshima Prefecture
Atomic bombings of Hiroshima and Nagasaki
Populated places established in 1589
Port settlements in Japan
Populated coastal places in Japan
World War II sites in Japan
1589 establishments in Asia
Cities designated by government ordinance of Japan
Destroyed cities